I Got Needs may refer to:
"I Got Needs", a 1997 television episode in the first season of Bump in the Night
"I Got Needs", a 1995 song on American rapper Count Bass D's album Pre-Life Crisis